The 1970 Campeonato Nacional de Futbol Profesional was first tier’s 38th season. Colo-Colo was the tournament's champion, winning its tenth honor after seven years without a title.

First stage

Torneo Metropolitano

Torneo Provincial

National Tournament

Zona A

Interzone

Zona B

Championship stage

Championship play-off

Relegation play-off

Top goalscorers

Copa Francisco Candelori
Played between the winners of the Torneo Metropolitano 1970 (Unión Española) and Torneo Provincial 1970 (Deportes Concepción).

Deportes Concepción won the Copa Francisco Candelori

References

External links
ANFP 

Primera División de Chile seasons
Prim
Chile